Hockerwood is one of the four ancient deer parks of Southwell, Nottinghamshire. Hockerwood Park is mentioned in the Domesday Book.

Geography of Nottinghamshire
Southwell, Nottinghamshire